Scenic reserves are a type of New Zealand protected area. They are the most common, and probably most widespread, form of protected area in the country. The reserve vary size: while most are less than 100 hectares, some are more than 1,000 hectares. Some are "islands of unspoilt nature in a sea of farmland".

Scenic reserves were first created when communities decided to keep some original vegetation in an area where most original vegetation had been removed. Most are patches of bush, often close to roads. Statutory control of scenic reserves was covered by the Scenery Preservation Act 1903 until the passing of the Reserves Act 1977.

Ball’s Clearing Scenic Reserve in Hawke’s Bay, an area of native forest fenced off from the surrounding pasture land, is typical scenic reserve.

North Island

The following scenic reserves are located in and around the North Island:

Northland

 Aponga Settlement Scenic Reserve
 Aputerewa Scenic Reserve
 Arapaoa River Scenic Reserve
 Awanui River Scenic Reserve
 Black Rocks Scenic Reserve
 Blake Bush Scenic Reserve
 Brattys Bush Scenic Reserve
 Bream Head Scenic Reserve
 Bream Islands Scenic Reserve
 Bream Tail Scenic Reserve
 Broadwood Scenic Reserve
 Brynderwyn Scenic Reserve
 Busby Head Scenic Reserve
 Collins Scenic Reserve
 Cooks Stream Scenic Reserve
 Deep Water Cove Scenic Reserve
 Dip Road Scenic Reserve
 Donnelly's Crossing Scenic Reserve
 Frampton Scenic Reserve
 Gill Road Scenic Reserve
 Gorrie Scenic Reserve
 Harrison Scenic Reserve
 Hilel Korman Scenic Reserve
 Horotutu Scenic Reserve
 Hugh Crawford Memorial Scenic Reserve
 Hukatere Scenic Reserve
 Hukatere School Site Scenic Reserve
 Kaeo Bush Scenic Reserve
 Kaiaka Quarry Scenic Reserve
 Kaihu Scenic Reserve
 Kaikohe Scenic Reserve
 Kaimarama Bay Scenic Reserve
 Kaimaro Scenic Reserve
 Kaitaia Scenic Reserve
 Kapiro Scenic Reserve
 Karakamatamata Scenic Reserve
 Katui Scenic Reserve
 Kauri Bushmans Memorial Scenic Reserve
 Kerikeri Inlet Scenic Reserve
 Kerikeri River Scenic Reserve
 Kings Kauri Scenic Reserve
 Kioreroa Scenic Reserve
 Kororareka Point Scenic Reserve
 Kukuparere Scenic Reserve
 Lake Waiporohita Scenic Reserve
 Langs Beach Scenic Reserve
 Lower Pahi River Scenic Reserve
 L T Hirst Scenic Reserve
 Mahinepua Peninsula Scenic Reserve
 Mamaranui Farm Settlement Scenic Reserve
 Manaia Ridge Scenic Reserve
 Manawahuna Scenic Reserve
 Mangakahia River Scenic Reserve
 Mangamuka Gorge Scenic Reserve
 Mangataipa Scenic Reserve
 Mangatete Farm Settlement Scenic Reserve
 Manginangina Scenic Reserve
 Mansbridge Scenic Reserve
 Marko Buselich Scenic Reserve
 Marlborough Road Scenic Reserve
 Marua Valley Scenic Reserve
 Mata Farm Settlement Scenic Reserve
 Matakohe River Scenic Reserve
 Mataraua Valley Scenic Reserve
 Matarau Island Scenic Reserve
 Maunganui Bluff Scenic Reserve
 Maungatapere Hill Scenic Reserve
 Maungatika Scenic Reserve
 Maungaturoto Scenic Reserve
 McKenzies of Limestone Hill Park Scenic Reserve
 Mimiha Scenic Reserve
 Mimiwhangata Scenic Reserve
 Mokaikai Scenic Reserve
 Montgomery's Memorial Bush Scenic Reserve
 Motatau Scenic Reserve
 Motuarahi Scenic Reserve
 Motukaraka Scenic Reserve
 Motu Kauri Island Scenic Reserve
 Motukawanui Island Scenic Reserve
 Motupapa Island Scenic Reserve
 Moturua Island Scenic Reserve
 Motutangi Scenic Reserve
 Motutapu Island Scenic Reserve
 Ngaiotonga Scenic Reserve
 Nga Kiekie Whawhanui a Uenuku Scenic Reserve
 Ngawha Scenic Reserve
 Ngunguru River Scenic Reserve
 Nihonui Scenic Reserve
 North River Scenic Reserve
 Okaharau Road Scenic Reserve
 Okahu Island Scenic Reserve
 Oke Bay Scenic Reserve
 Onoke Scenic Reserve
 Opouteke Scenic Reserve
 Opua Scenic Reserve
 Oraora Scenic Reserve
 Otaika Valley Scenic Reserve
 Otaneroa Scenic Reserve
 Otito Scenic Reserve
 Owhuia Scenic Reserve
 Paeroa-Knuckle Point Scenic Reserve
 Pakanae Reserve
 Pakaraka Kauri Scenic Reserve
 Pakotai Scenic Reserve
 Papakuri Scenic Reserve
 Paparoa Creek Scenic Reserve
 Paponga Scenic Reserve
 Parahaki Scenic Reserve
 Parahi Scenic Reserve
 Paranui Scenic Reserve
 Pareokawa Water Conservation Scenic Reserve
 Pitokuku Scenic Reserve
 Pohuenui Scenic Reserve
 Popo Scenic Reserve
 Poroporo Island Scenic Reserve
 Poupouwhenua Scenic Reserve
 Pukeareinga Scenic Reserve
 Pukekaroro Scenic Reserve
 Pukekohe Hill Scenic Reserve
 Pukemiro Block Scenic Reserve
 Puketi Scenic Reserve
 Puketona Scenic Reserve
 Purua Scenic Reserve
 Rabbit & Goat Island Scenic Reserve
 Rainbow Falls Scenic Reserve
 Ranfurly Bay Scenic Reserve
 Rangitane Scenic Reserve
 Rawene Scenic Reserve
 Reotahi Scenic Reserve
 Riponui Scenic Reserve
 Robert Hastie Memorial Scenic Reserve
 Rotokakahi River Scenic Reserve
 Ruakākā Scenic Reserve
 Runaruna Scenic Reserve
 Smokey Hill Scenic Reserve
 Soda Springs Scenic Reserve
 Stockyard Point Scenic Reserve
 St. Pauls Rock Scenic Reserve
 Sweetwater Scenic Reserve
 Taha Moana Scenic Reserve
 Taheke Scenic Reserve
 Takou River Scenic Reserve
 Tamateatai Point Scenic Reserve
 Tangowahine Scenic Reserve
 Tapuhi Scenic Reserve
 Tapuwae Scenic Reserve
 Taraire Scenic Reserve
 Taranaki Island Scenic Reserve
 Tauranga Valley Scenic Reserve
 Te Koroa Scenic Reserve
 Te Kowhai Creek Scenic Reserve
 Te Opu Scenic Reserve
 Te Toroa Scenic Reserve
 Te - Uri - O - Hau Scenic Reserve
 Te Wai-O-Te Marama Scenic Reserve
 Timperleys Bush Scenic Reserve
 Tipatipa Scenic Reserve
 Tokatoka Scenic Reserve
 Topuni Scenic Reserve
 Toretore Island Scenic Reserve
 Trounson Kauri Park Scenic Reserve
 Tutamoe Scenic Reserve
 Upper Pahi River Scenic Reserve
 Upper Paparoa Creek Scenic Reserve
 Uretiti Scenic Reserve
 Utakura Scenic Reserve
 Wahaotetupua Scenic Reserve
 Waimamaku Scenic Reserve
 Waimata Settlement Scenic Reserve
 Waiotama Scenic Reserve
 Waipapa Stream Scenic Reserve
 Waipu Caves Road Scenic Reserve
 Waipu Gorge Scenic Reserve
 Waipu Scenic Reserve
 Wairua Falls Scenic Reserve
 Waitangi Wetland Scenic Reserve
 Waitawa Scenic Reserve
 Waro Limestone Scenic Reserve
 Watkin Powel Scenic Reserve
 Wekaweka Scenic Reserve
 Whakaangi Scenic Reserve
 Whakapirau River Scenic Reserve
 Whangamumu Scenic Reserve
 Whangaruru Harbour Scenic Reserve
 Whangaruru North Head Scenic Reserve

Auckland 

 Burgess Island Scenic Reserve
 Harataonga Scenic Reserve
 Kawau Island Scenic Reserve
 Kohatutara Scenic Reserve
 Kotuku Point Scenic Reserve
 Leigh Scenic Reserve
 Mataitai Scenic Reserve
 Mātaitai Scenic Reserve
 Moturekareka Island Scenic Reserve
 Motutara Island Scenic Reserve
 Ngā Pona-toru-a-Peretū Scenic Reserve
 Papa Turoa Scenic Reserve
 Rabbit & Goat Island Scenic Reserve
 Rakitu Island Scenic Reserve
 Rangatawhiri Scenic Reserve
 Rangitoto Island Scenic Reserve
 Raventhorpe Scenic Reserve
 Richardson Scenic Reserve
 Sharp Point Scenic Reserve
 Smeltinghouse Bay Scenic Reserve
 Tai Rawhiti Scenic Reserve
 Te Atamira Scenic Reserve
 Te Matuku Bay Scenic Reserve
 Te Morehu Scenic Reserve
 Ti Point Scenic Reserve
 Tryphena Scenic Reserve
 Waiheke Island Scenic Reserve
 Wairoa Gorge Scenic Reserve
 Whakatiri Scenic Reserve

South Island

The following scenic reserves are located in and around the South Island:

Nelson

 Boulder Bank Scenic Reserve
 Cable Bay Scenic Reserve
 Whangamoa Scenic Reserve

West Coast

 Ahaura-Kopara Scenic Reserve
 Arnold River Scenic Reserve
 Arorangi Scenic Reserve
 Blackadder Scenic Reserve
 Coal Creek Scenic Reserve
 Costello Hill Scenic Reserve
 Dee Creek Scenic Reserve
 Denniston Road - Scenic Reserve
 Denniston Scenic Reserve
 Four Mile Scenic Reserve
 Hiwinui Scenic Reserve
 Inangahua Landing Scenic Reserve
 Kaiata Scenic Reserve
 Karamea Bluff Scenic Reserve
 Karamea River Scenic Reserve
 Langridge Scenic Reserve
 Lewis Pass Scenic Reserve
 Lower Buller Gorge Scenic Reserve
 Mai Mai Scenic Reserve
 Mawheraiti Scenic Reserve
 Mirfin Scenic Reserve
 Mount Courtney Scenic Reserve
 Ngakawau Scenic Reserve
 Okari Spit Scenic Reserve
 Omotumotu Scenic Reserve
 Orowaiti Estuary Scenic Reserve
 Orowaiti River Scenic Reserve
 Otututu Scenic Reserve
 Punakaiki Scenic Reserve
 Rahu Scenic Reserve
 Rapahoe Range Scenic Reserve
 Rosemount Scenic Reserve
 Rough and Brown Creek Scenic Reserve
 Station Creek Scenic Reserve
 Stockton Scenic Reserve
 Tini Kaiwai Scenic Reserve
 Upper Buller Gorge Scenic Reserve
 Woolley River Scenic Reserve

Canterbury

 Adderley Head Scenic Reserve
 Ahuriri Bush Scenic Reserve
 Akaroa Head Scenic Reserve
 Alford Scenic Reserve
 Armstrong Scenic Reserve
 Ben Avon Scenic Reserve
 Buckleys Bay Scenic Reserve
 Burke Pass Scenic Reserve
 Carews Peak Scenic Reserve
 Cass Peak Scenic Reserve
 Cave Stream Scenic Reserve
 Claremont Scenic Reserve
 Coopers Knob Scenic Reserve
 Devils Gap Scenic Reserve
 Ellangowan Scenic Reserve
 Fyffe Palmer Scenic Reserve
 Garden Of Tane Scenic Reserve
 Glenralloch Scenic Reserve
 Goodwin Scenic Reserve
 Goose Bay-Omihi Scenic Reserve
 Gore Bay Scenic Reserve
 Governors Bay Scenic Reserve
 Hae Hae Te Moana Scenic Reserve
 Half Moon Bay Scenic Reserve
 Hapuku Scenic Reserve
 Hay Scenic Reserve
 Herbert Peak Scenic Reserve
 Hoods Bush Scenic Reserve
 Hoon Hay Scenic Reserve
 Hunter Native Forest Scenic Reserve
 Isolated Hill Scenic Reserve
 Jollies Bush Scenic Reserve
 Jordan Stream Scenic Reserve
 Kaituna Spur Scenic Reserve
 Kaituna Valley Scenic Reserve
 Karetu Scenic Reserve
 Kean Point Scenic Reserve
 Kennedys Bush Scenic Reserve
 King Billy Island Scenic Reserve
 Kura Tāwhiti Scenic Reserve
 Kurow Scenic Reserve
 Lake Alexandrina Scenic Reserve
 Lake Grasmere Scenic Reserve
 Lake Guyon Scenic Reserve
 Lake Tennyson Scenic Reserve
 Lewis Pass Scenic Reserve
 Limestone Creek Scenic Reserve
 Lindis Pass Scenic Reserve
 Little Akaroa Scenic Reserve
 Long Bay Scenic Reserve
 Lords Bush Scenic Reserve
 Lottery Bush Scenic Reserve
 Lyttelton Scenic Reserve
 Magnet Bay Scenic Reserve
 Mangamaunu Scenic Reserve
 Manuka Bay Scenic Reserve
 Matata Scenic Reserve
 Montgomery Park Scenic Reserve
 Morice Settlement Scenic Reserve
 Mount Manakau Scenic Reserve
 Mount Sinclair Scenic Reserve
 Mt Alford Scenic Reserve
 Mt Cavendish Scenic Reserve
 Mt Fitzgerald Scenic Reserve
 Mt Nimrod Scenic Reserve
 Mt Pearce Scenic Reserve
 Napenape Scenic Reserve
 Ngaroma Scenic Reserve
 Ohau Terminal Moraine Scenic Reserve
 Okiwi Bay Scenic Reserve - Kaikoura
 Okuti Valley Scenic Reserve
 Orari Gorge Scenic Reserve
 Otaio Gorge Scenic Reserve
 Otepatotu Scenic Reserve
 Palm Gully Scenic Reserve
 Paparoa Point Scenic Reserve
 Pareora Scenic Reserve
 Peel Forest Park Scenic Reserve
 Peraki Bay Scenic Reserve
 Peraki Saddle Scenic Reserve
 Pudding Hill Scenic Reserve
 Puhi Puhi Scenic Reserve
 Rakautara Scenic Reserve
 Raules Gully Scenic Reserve
 Shag Rock Scenic Reserve
 Sharplin Falls Scenic Reserve
 Sign Of The Packhorse Scenic Reserve
 Snowden Scenic Reserve
 Sugarloaf Scenic Reserve
 Talbot Forest Scenic Reserve
 Tapuae O Uenuku Scenic Reserve
 Tasman Smith Scenic Reserve
 Tauhinu-korokio Scenic Reserve
 Tenehaun Scenic Reserve
 Te Oka Scenic Reserve
 Terako Downs Scenic Reserve
 The Tors Scenic Reserve
 Thomson Park Scenic Reserve
 Tiromoana Scenic Reserve
 Tutakakahikura Scenic Reserve
 View Hill Scenic Reserve
 Waghorn Scenic Reserve
 Waiau Rivermouth Scenic Reserve
 Waihi Gorge Scenic Reserve
 Wainui Scenic Reserve
 Waipuna Saddle Scenic Reserve
 Wairangi Scenic Reserve
 Whatarangi Totara Scenic Reserve
 Witch Hill Scenic Reserve

References

Protected areas of New Zealand
Lists of tourist attractions in New Zealand
New Zealand environment-related lists